Khalahali is a community council located in the Mokhotlong District of Lesotho. Its population in 2006 was 8,220.

Villages
The community of Khalahali includes the villages of:

BoritsaBothakhisa-ntjaHa KhamaHa Khethisa (Thoteng)Ha LechesaHa MakhabaneHa MakulaneHa MalinyaneHa MothebesoaneHa Ntone

Hlokoa-le-mafiKoakoatsiLikhangLikoekoengLimapongLinarengLitšoenengMahanengMakeneng

MapatengMaphallengMasenkengMatebelengMatsoapongMoeanengMotalanengMotsitsengMphokojoane

MphosisaPatisingPhahamengSakengSekhutloanengSekokaSepatlengTšoana-MakhuloTšopholing

References

External links
 Google map of community villages

Populated places in Mokhotlong District